Limnatis is a village in the Limassol District of Cyprus, five kilometres south of Agios Mamas.

References

Communities in Limassol District